Policy Impact Assessments (IAs) are formal, evidence-based procedures that assess the economic, social, and environmental effects of public policy. They have been incorporated into policy making in the OECD countries and the European Commission.

Key types of impact assessments include global assessments (global level), policy impact assessment (policy level), strategic environmental assessment (programme and plan level), and environmental impact assessment (project level). Impact assessments can focus on specific themes, such as social impact assessments and gender impact assessments.

IAs can improve legislation by:
 Informing policy makers about potential economic, social, and environmental ramifications
 Improving transparency so that contributions to sustainability and "better regulation" are disclosed and special interest lobbying is discouraged
 Increasing public participation in order to reflect a range of considerations, thereby improving the legitimacy of policies
 Clarifying how public policy helps achieve its goals and priorities through policy indicators
 Contributing to continuous learning in policy development by identifying causalities that inform ex-post review of policies

Procedure 
The department which is responsible for the policy proposal usually has to carry out the IA. Although the purpose and orientation of IA procedures differ, IA guidelines in the various jurisdictions all follow a similar set of steps to be followed by desk officers:
 Planning of the IA
 Carrying out the impact analysis
 Consultation of affected stakeholders and the general public
 Coordination with affected departments
 Summary and presentation of findings in a report
 Forwarding findings to decision makers
 Publication of the IA report (not in all countries)

The analytical steps, which mainly relate to step 2, can be set out as
i.	Problem definition
ii.	Definition of policy objectives
iii.	Development of policy options
iv.	Analysis of impacts
v.	Comparison of policy options and recommendation of one option
vi.	Defining monitoring measures.

Methods 
Throughout the IA process, methods can be used for support. In recent years governments have increasingly invested in developing and applying methods and tools for IA.
Depending on usage, IA methods can be classified as methods for
 Scoping (e.g., checklists)
 For qualitative analysis (e.g., focus groups)
 For quantitative analysis (e.g., life-cycle assessment, material flow accounting, modelling)
 Aggregation and comparison of options (e.g., cost–benefit analysis)
 Analysing coherence (e.g., Gender IA)
 Supporting participation and involvement (e.g., internet consultation)
 Data presentation and involvement (e.g., GIS)
 Monitoring and evaluation (e.g., indicators)

See also 
 Impact evaluation
 Outcomes theory
 Participatory impact pathways analysis
 Policy analysis
 Policy studies
 Program evaluation

References

External links 
 International Association for Impact Assessment (main source)
 Impact Assessment and Project Appraisal (a journal)
 Impact Assessment Page at the European Commission
 IAIA Wiki

 
Management cybernetics
Educational evaluation methods